Celebrity Big Brother 16, also known as Celebrity Big Brother: UK vs USA, was the sixteenth series of the British reality television series Celebrity Big Brother, hosted by Emma Willis and narrated by Marcus Bentley. The series launched on 27 August 2015 on Channel 5 in the United Kingdom and TV3 in Ireland, and ended after 29 days on 24 September 2015. It is the ninth celebrity series and the fourteenth series of Big Brother overall to air on Channel 5. It was the only celebrity series to credit Denis O'Connor as creative director.

James Hill was named as the winner on 24 September.

Austin Armacost returned to the house for Celebrity Big Brother 19 as an All-Star, representing this series. He was second to be evicted.

Production

Live streaming
On 14 August 2015, it was revealed that Channel 5 had partially reinstated live streaming from the House. For the first time since 2013, live streaming would air every weekday between midnight and 1am on 5*. 30 minutes of live streaming will also air on Channel 5 after the live eviction show on Friday, meaning 90 minutes of live streaming will air every Friday.

Best bits series
On 20 August 2015 it was revealed that a special six-part best bits series would be airing every Saturday night on 5*. The series will look back at some of the best moments from Celebrity Big Brother history and will feature a range of special guests. Each episode would have its own topic, the first being "Heroes vs Villains", with the second being "Flirty Friendships and more". The series began on 29 August 2015.

Bit on the Side
Channel 5 confirmed on 31 July 2015 that Big Brother's Bit on the Side would be airing seven nights a week for the first time since 2014. The weekday episodes will air on Channel 5, with the weekend episodes airing on 5*.

Teasers
The first five-second teaser for Celebrity Big Brother aired on 31 July 2015 confirming the theme UK v USA. Channel 5 later revealed the full length advert on 7 August 2015. The advert featured hosts Emma Willis and Rylan Clark.

Sponsorship
Lucozade returns to sponsor Celebrity Big Brother after previously sponsoring Big Brother 16 earlier in the year.

House
The house was redecorated following the sixteenth civilian series. The house was decorated with British and American iconography to suit the UK v USA theme. House pictures were officially revealed on 23 August 2015.

Housemates

On Day 1, twelve Housemates entered the House. On Day 2, a further two Housemates entered.

Austin Armacost
Austin Armacost  is an American reality television personality, who is best known for his role in The A-List: New York, as well as dating fashion designer Marc Jacobs. He entered the House on Day 1. He left the House on Day 29 as the runner-up. He later returned to compete in Celebrity Big Brother 19 as an "All star" housemate.

Bobby Davro
Bobby Davro is an English actor and comedian best known for his work as an impressionist. He made his television debut in 1981, but it wasn't until 1983 that he made his television breakthrough at Live from Her Majesty's, followed by appearances on the television show, Who Do You Do?. He entered the House on Day 2, competing against Janice Dickinson in order to win the title of "Prime Minister". He finished in fourth place on Day 29.

Chris Ellison
Ellison is an English actor. He is best known for his role as DCI Frank Burnside in the popular ITV police series The Bill and short-lived spin-off series Burnside. He entered the House on Day 1 representing Team UK. On Day 13 he became the second Housemate to be evicted.

Daniel Baldwin
Daniel Baldwin is an American actor, film director and film producer. He is the second eldest of the four Baldwin brothers, all of whom are actors (one of whom Stephen Baldwin, appeared in Celebrity Big Brother 7) as well as part of the Baldwin family. Baldwin is known for his role as Detective Beau Felton in the popular NBC TV series Homicide: Life on the Street. He entered the House on Day 1 representing Team USA, but became the first Housemate to be evicted on Day 9.

Farrah Abraham
Farrah Abraham is an American television personality. She came to prominence after being cast in the reality television series 16 and Pregnant, which documented the pregnancies and first months of motherhood for several young women. She then became part of the spin-off series, Teen Mom until it was axed in 2012. The show was revived for the fifth season in 2015 as Teen Mom: Original Girls. She entered the House on Day 1. On Day 16 she was fake evicted along with Jenna and moved into Big Brother's Luxury Suite where they spied on the other Housemates until their return on Day 18. Unbeknownst to them, the other Housemates were in on the secret. She became the fifth Housemate to be evicted following an eviction showdown on Day 23.

Gail Porter
Gail Porter is a Scottish television presenter and personality, and former model. In the 1990s she became known for photos in men's magazines such as FHM, including one nude which was projected on to the Houses of Parliament. She moved into television, becoming a presenter. Her career was affected by alopecia, which in her case resulted in a total loss of her hair. She entered the House on Day 1. On Day 20 she became the fourth Housemate to be evicted.

James Hill
James Hill is an English reality television personality, who rose to fame following his appearance during the tenth series of The Apprentice. He entered the House on Day 1. On Day 29 he was announced as the winner of the series.

Janice Dickinson
Janice Dickinson is an American model, photographer, author and talent agent. Initially notable as a model, she has been described by herself and others as the first supermodel. She entered the House on Day 2, competing against Bobby Davro in order to win the title of "President". Janice became the seventh Housemate to be evicted on Day 27.

Jenna Jameson
Jenna Jameson is an American entrepreneur, webcam model and former pornographic film actress, who has been called the world's most famous adult-entertainment performer and "The Queen of Porn". She entered the House on Day 1. On Day 16 she was fake evicted along with Farrah and moved into Big Brother's Luxury Suite where they spied on the other Housemates until their return on Day 18. Unbeknownst to them, the other Housemates were in on the secret. She became the sixth Housemate to be evicted on Day 27.

Natasha Hamilton
Natasha Hamilton is an English singer-songwriter, dancer and occasional stage actress.  She is a member of girl group Atomic Kitten. She entered the House on Day 1. She finished in third place on Day 29.

Scoop
Isaac Freeman III, better known by his stage name Fatman Scoop (or simply Scoop), is an American hype man, hip hop promoter and radio personality famed for his on-stage rough, raw, loud voice. He is known for the song "Be Faithful" which went to number one in the UK and Ireland in late 2003 and top 5 in Australia. He entered the House on Day 1. On Day 10, Scoop was voted as President of the House. He became the third Housemate to be evicted from the House on Day 20.

Sherrie Hewson
Sherrie Hutchinson is an English actress, presenter, broadcaster, television personality and novelist. She is best known for her roles in Coronation Street, Crossroads, Emmerdale and Benidorm. Since 2003, she has also been a regular panellist on lunchtime chat show Loose Women. She entered the House on Day 1. She finished in sixth place on Day 29.

Stevi Ritchie & Chloe-Jasmine Whichello
Stevi Ritchie and Chloe-Jasmine Whichello, the latter of whom is better known by her stage name Chloe Jasmine, are a couple who appeared (separately) in the eleventh series of The X Factor. They entered the House on Day 1 competing as one Housemate. They finished in fifth place on Day 29.

Tila Tequila
Thien Nguyen, better known by her stage names Tila Tequila, Miss Tila (or simply Tila), is an American model, television personality, singer, songwriter, actress, writer and blogger. She entered the House on Day 1 as an American contestant. However, she was ejected on her second day in the House after it was discovered that she had posted items on social media proclaiming her support for Adolf Hitler, Nazism and white supremacism, along with photos of herself in Nazi outfits.

House guests

Paul Burrell
On Day 6, Paul Burrell, a former British Royal Household servant, footman and butler, entered the House to accommodate the "Big Brother Royal Family" task. He left the House on Day 9.

Jennie Bond
On Day 7, Jennie Bond, a British journalist and television presenter, briefly entered the House as part of the "Big Brother Royal Family" task where she interviewed Lord James and Lady Natasha. Both were unaware that the American servants were watching from the potato-peeling tower.

Emma Willis
On Day 23, presenter Emma Willis briefly entered the House as part of an eviction showdown leading to Farrah's departure. Willis then immediately left the House to prepare for her interview.

Eamonn Holmes
On Day 27, Eamonn Holmes briefly entered the House as part of the "Battle of the Nations" task, in which he would ask questions to the Housemates about the public's perception of them. He later returned that day as a guest on Big Brother's Bit on the Side, which was presented from inside the House.

Summary

Nominations table
Key:
 Team UK
 Team USA

Notes

Ratings
Official ratings are taken from BARB.

References

External links
 Official website 
 

2015 British television seasons
16